Riograndense Futebol Clube, commonly known as Riograndense, is a Brazilian football club based in Santa Maria, Rio Grande do Sul and part of state league competition in the state of Rio Grande do Sul.

History
The club was founded on 7 May 1912. They won the Campeonato do Interior Gaúcho in 1921, and the Campeonato Gaúcho Série A2 in 1978, beating Cachoeira.

Accomplishments
 Campeonato Gaúcho Série A2:
 Winners: 1978
 Campeonato do Interior Gaúcho:
 Winners: 1921

Stadium
Riograndense Futebol Clube play their home games at Estádio dos Eucaliptos. The stadium has a maximum capacity of 5,000 people.

References

Association football clubs established in 1912
Football clubs in Rio Grande do Sul
1912 establishments in Brazil